KCOW (1400 AM) is a radio station broadcasting an oldies music format. It is licensed to Alliance, Nebraska, United States. The station is currently owned by Eagle Communications, Inc. and features programming from ABC Radio.

References

External links
FCC History Cards for KCOW

COW
Oldies radio stations in the United States